"Wish You Would" is a song by American hip hop recording artist Ludacris, released September 2, 2008 as the first single from his sixth studio album Theater of the Mind (2008). The song, produced by DJ Toomp, features Ludacris' former rival, fellow Southern rapper T.I. At the 2009 Grammy Awards, the song was nominated for an award in the category of Best Rap Performance by a Duo or Group. The song ultimately lost to T.I.'s respective single, "Swagga Like Us".

In October 2008, American hip hop production duo Play-N-Skillz composed a remix, giving it one of their own productions.

Background
After the song was leaked, MTV interviewed both Ludacris and T.I., who were involved in a high-profile dispute for several years. Ludacris said, "I felt like there was no bigger event in hip-hop at this moment than me and T.I. working together." T.I. said, "We had figure if it ain't no problem and we don't have no issues, no beef, then there's no reason we shouldn't be able to get together and make music." Artists from both Disturbing tha Peace and Grand Hustle were as surprised as anyone else. T.I. and Ludacris also collaborated on T.I.'s 2008 studio album Paper Trail, on the song "On Top of the World", also featuring B.o.B.

Chart positions

References

2008 singles
2008 songs
Ludacris songs
T.I. songs
Def Jam Recordings singles
Song recordings produced by DJ Toomp
Songs written by Ludacris
Songs written by T.I.
Songs written by DJ Toomp